Life in the Citadel is a 1947 Estonian drama and war film directed by Herbert Rappaport and based on the novel of the same name by August Jakobson. This film was the first film which was made in Soviet Estonia.

Awards, nominations, participations:
 1948: Stalin Prize (USSR), 2nd tier prize to Herbert Rappaport, Hugo Laur, Lia Laats, Lembit Rajala

Plot

Cast
 Hugo Laur - Professor August Miilas, a botanist
 Aino Talvi - Eeva Miilas, his wife
 Gunnar Kilgas - Karl Miilas, their son
 Lia Laats	- Lydia Miilas, their daughter
 Lembit Rajala	- Ralf Miilas, professor's son from his first marriage
 Andres Särev - Dr. Richard Miilas, professor's nephew 
 Betty Kuuskemaa - Anna 
 Rudolf Nuude - Ants Kuslap 
 Aleksander Randviir - Kiinast, carpenter 
 Boris Dobronravov - Professor Golovin, a professor of medical science 
 Eduard Tinn - Lillak
 Johannes Kaljola - German officer 
 Meta Luts - Mrs. Värihein
 Paul Pinna - Worker 
 Oskar Põlla - Berens
 Voldemar Panso - Jaan Sander
 Ande Rahe - Lehte
 Anne Lindau - Little Marta
 Kaarel Ird - Western spy
 Ants Eskola - Western spy
 Ants Lauter	
 Eduard Türk

References

External links
 
 Life in the Citadel, entry in Estonian Film Database (EFIS)

1947 films
Estonian war drama films
Estonian-language films
Soviet-era Estonian films
Films based on Estonian novels